Church Street  may refer to:

Places

Streets
 Church Street and Trinity Place, New York City, United States
 Church Street (Nashville, Tennessee), United States
 Church Street (Sheffield), England, United Kingdom
 Church Street (Toronto), Ontario, Canada
 Church Street (Warrington), England
 Church Street (York), England
 Church Street, Bangalore, India
 Church Street, Liverpool, England, United Kingdom
 Church Street, Monmouth, Wales, United Kingdom
 Church Street, Wollongong, New South Wales, Australia
 Church Street, Singapore

Other places
 Church Street (ward), an electoral ward in the City of Westminster, London, England, United Kingdom
 Church Street Graveyard, an historic city cemetery located in Mobile, Alabama, United States
 Church Street tram stop, Croydon, England, United Kingdom
 Church Street-Caddy Hill Historic District, in North Adams, Massachusetts, United States

Businesses
 Church Street Health Management, operator of Small Smiles Dental Centers
 Church Street Marketplace, Burlington, Vermont, United States

See also
 Kirkgate, Leith, a street in Scotland
 Rue de l'Église, in French

 Church Street Historic District (disambiguation)
 Church Street station (disambiguation)

Odonyms referring to a building
Odonyms referring to religion